Louise Moyes is a Canadian dancer and choreographer based in St. John's, Newfoundland and Labrador. Moyes is known for what she calls docu-dances, multi-disciplinary theatrical shows she creates by working with the rhythms of voices and accents as if they were a musical score. Moyes has performed across Canada and in Germany, Italy, Iceland, New York, Australia and Brazil.

Performance work

Docu-dance works include ‘Moore-Gallant: a docudance’, staged short stories by Lisa Moore and Mavis Gallant; ‘St. John’s Women’; ‘Florence’; ‘Taking in Strangers’; and ‘unravelling the borders.’

Film work

Moyes often directs film footage to use in her live performances.
In 2019, she produced and appeared in the short film, On Hold. The film was shown at the Dance: Made in Canada Festival in Toronto and at the St. John's International Women's Film Festival.

Awards

In 2014, Moyes received a Manning Heritage Award for her dramatic presentation of francophone history in Newfoundland.

In 2016, Moyes received the Canada Council for the Arts' Victor Martyn Lynch-Staunton Award (for Innovation in Dance by a mid-career artist).

External links
 Docudances

References 

1965 births
Canadian female dancers
Living people
Canadian choreographers
People from St. John's, Newfoundland and Labrador
Canadian women choreographers